Easter biscuits are a traditional British cuisine gift, given to guests on Easter Sunday.

Originating from the West Country, they are made from flour, butter, egg yolk, baking powder, and sugar. Lightly spiced, the currant-studded soft and round biscuits have a soft, biscuity, sugary crunch. Some traditional recipes originating from the Somerset-area include Cassia oil, in the belief that it was used in the embalming process used to clean Jesus's body after his crucifixion.

See also
Koulourakia Greek Easter biscuits

References

External links
BBC Good Food Guide recipe for Easter biscuits

British cuisine
Easter food
Biscuits